The 2022–23 V-League season is the 19th season of the V-League, the highest professional volleyball league in South Korea. The season run from 22 October 2022 to 7 April 2023.

Teams

Men's clubs

Women's clubs

Season standing procedure
 Match won 3–0 or 3–1: 3 points for the winner, 0 points for the loser.
 Match won 3–2: 2 points for the winner, 1 point for the loser.
 Standings – Points, matches won, Sets ratio, Points ratio, then Result of the last match between the tied teams
 If the 4th-placed team finishes within three points of the 3rd placed team, an extra league game is played between these two teams.

Regular season
If the fourth ranked team finishes within three points of the third ranked team, a semi playoff will be held between the two teams to decide who advances to the playoff game.

League table (Men's)

Source: League table (Men's)

League table (Women's)

Source: League table (Women's)

Results / Fixtures – Men

Rounds 1 and 2

Rounds 3 and 4

Rounds 5 and 6

Results / Fixtures – Women

Rounds 1 and 2

Rounds 3 and 4

Rounds 5 and 6

Final stage

Bracket (Men's)

Bracket (Women's)

Attendance

Men's teams

Many games from the previous season had restricted attendance due to COVID protocols.

Women's teams

Many games from the previous season had restricted attendance due to COVID protocols.

Top Performers

Men's (Points)

Source: 남자부 선수 기록

Women's (Points)

Source: 여자부 선수 기록

Player of the Round

Men's

Women's

Final standing

Men's League

Women's League

References

V-League
V-League
V-League
V-League
V-League (South Korea)
V-League
V-League